|}

The Prix Thomas Bryon is a Group 3 flat horse race in France open to two-year-old thoroughbreds. It is run at Saint-Cloud over a distance of 1,400 metres (about 7 furlongs), and it is scheduled to take place each year in October.

History
The event is named after Thomas Bryon, an Englishman who helped establish thoroughbred racing in France. He was the secretary at the founding meeting of the Société d'Encouragement in 1833, and published the first volume of the Calendrier des Courses de Chevaux in 1834.

The Prix Thomas Bryon was established in 1924, and it was initially contested over 1,600 metres. It was shortened to 1,500 metres in 1927. It was abandoned throughout World War II, with no running from 1939 to 1945.

The race took place at Longchamp in 1954, and at this point it reverted to 1,600 metres. It began a second period over 1,500 metres in 1958.

The Prix Thomas Bryon was restored to 1,600 metres in 1991. It was staged in November from 1995 to 2000, and was switched to the first half of October in 2001. The distance was reduced to 1,400 metres again in 2015 as part of a series of changes to autumn races for two-year-olds.

Records
Leading jockey (4 wins):
 Roger Poincelet – Iror (1947), Fort Napoleon (1949), Atrax (1959), Blaze of Glory (1961)
 Yves Saint-Martin – Sweet Girl (1960), Paolina (1963), First Bloom (1971), Melyno (1981)
 Maxime Guyon - Abtaal (2011), Earnshaw (2013), Alea Iacta (2014), Dreamflight (2021)

Leading trainer (10 wins):
 André Fabre – Fadeyev (1993), Housamix (1994), Pinakaral (1998), Songlark (2002), Apsis (2003), Thewayyouare (2007), Earnshaw (2013), Alea Iacta (2014), Candide (2015), Dreamflight (2021)

Leading owner (4 wins):
 François Dupré – Apostol (1956), Regent (1958), Sweet Girl (1960), Paolina (1963)
 Guy de Rothschild – Chesa (1962), Fermina (1965), General (1976), Kenmare (1977)

Winners since 1978

Earlier winners

 1924: Frisette
 1925: Nino
 1926: Farnese / Pescaro *
 1927: Costette
 1928: Meeting
 1929: Potiphar
 1930: Mydas
 1931: Formosan / Pure Folie *
 1932: Bipearl
 1933: Mas d'Antibes
 1934: Sanglot
 1935: Fastnet
 1936: Solace
 1937: La Sultane
 1938: Blue Moon
 1939–45: no race
 1946:
 1947: Iror
 1948: Tulette
 1949: Fort Napoleon
 1950: Mat de Cocagne
 1951: La Mirambule
 1952: For Chemist
 1953:
 1954:
 1955: Cernobbio
 1956: Apostol
 1957: La Malivoye
 1958: Regent
 1959: Atrax
 1960: Sweet Girl
 1961: Blaze of Glory
 1962: Chesa
 1963: Paolina
 1964: Faristan
 1965: Fermina
 1966: Farabi
 1967: Lady Millie
 1968: Beaugency
 1969: Army Court
 1970: Old and Wise
 1971: First Bloom
 1972: Targowice
 1973: Northern Taste
 1974: Dealer's Ace
 1975: Arctic Tern
 1976: General
 1977: Kenmare

* The 1926 and 1931 races were dead-heats and have joint winners.

See also
 List of French flat horse races

References

 France Galop / Racing Post:
 france-galop.com – A Brief History: Prix Thomas Bryon.
 galopp-sieger.de – Prix Thomas Bryon.
 horseracingintfed.com – International Federation of Horseracing Authorities – Prix Thomas Bryon (2018).
 pedigreequery.com – Prix Thomas Bryon – Saint-Cloud.

Flat horse races for two-year-olds
Saint-Cloud Racecourse
Horse races in France
Recurring sporting events established in 1924